Known by his moniker, Cú Connacht mac Dundach ("The Hound of Connacht, Son of Dundach")  (died 1006) was King of Síol Anmchadha, Ireland.

He is described as King in the Annals of Innisfallen. He was killed in battle near Lorrha by the Muskerry of County Cork, though other annals state he was killed by either Brian Boru or his son, Murchad. His son, Dundach mac Cú Connacht was lord of Síol Anmchadha from 1027 to 1032. He was an uncle of Madudan mac Gadhra Mór, ancestor of the Ó Madden family.

References

O'Madáin: History of the O'Maddens of Hy-Many, Gerard Madden, 2004. .

People from County Galway
Monarchs killed in action
11th-century Irish monarchs
1006 deaths
Year of birth unknown